The BBQ is a 2018 Australian comedy film written and directed by Stephen Amis. Starring Shane Jacobson, Magda Szubanski, Julia Zemiro, Nicholas Hammond, and Manu Feildel. It was filmed at Albury, New South Wales. My Kitchen Rules co-host Manu Feildel has a guest role in the film.

Plot synopsis
Shane Jacobson stars as Dazza, a loveable suburban everyman who claims to be a descendant of Captain Cook and has a passion for barbequing, but after accidentally giving his neighbours food poisoning at his regular Saturday BBQ, Dazza's reputation and dignity are on the line. Seeking atonement, he teams up with a tyrannical Scottish chef known as "The Butcher" and enters an international BBQ competition.

Cast
Sam Winspear-Schillings as Dave
Shane Jacobson as Dazza
Nicholas Hammond as Carver
Lara Robinson as Montana
Magda Szubanski as The Butcher
Faith Seci as Samantha
Justine Jones as Lisa
Rodney Afif as Mr. Spittle
Manu Feildel as Andre Mont Blanc
Julia Zemiro as Dianne

Reception
The BBQ received negative reviews from critics and audiences.

Leigh Paatsch of the Herald Sun called the film "so overwhelmingly bland, you often forget how faintly awful it consistently remains from beginning to end." Luke Buckmaster of The Guardian wrote, "Jacobson may be the best thing about the director and co-writer Stephen Amis' The BBQ, though that is not the same as saying he comes even remotely close to saving it."

References

External links
The BBQ on IMDb
The BBQ on Rotten Tomatoes

2018 films
Australian comedy films
2010s English-language films
Screen Australia films